Church of St. George is the Serbian Orthodox Church, located in Čukarica, Belgrade, in Banovo Brdo and built between 1928 and 1932. The Church was designed by Russian architect Androsov, and It is situated on the edge of the hill overlooking the Sava River.

References

Serbian Orthodox churches in Belgrade
Serbian Orthodox church buildings in Serbia
20th-century Serbian Orthodox church buildings
Christian organizations established in 1932
1932 establishments in Serbia
Church buildings with domes
Čukarica